Martainneville is a commune in the Somme department in Hauts-de-France in northern France.

Geography
The railway line, opened in 1872, that moved both freight and passengers, is now closed (in 1993).

Population

See also
Communes of the Somme department

References

External links

  Website of the 17th century Château de Martainneville

Communes of Somme (department)